Piercy may refer to:

Piercy, California
 Andy Piercy
 Bill Piercy
 Charles W. Piercy (1833–1861), American politician
 Kitty Piercy
 Marge Piercy
 Thomas Piercy
 William Piercy, 1st Baron Piercy

See also

 Piercey (disambiguation)